The Office of the Auditor General Manitoba—known as the Audit Office (1876–1916), Office of the Comptroller-General (1916–69), and Office of the Provincial Auditor (1969–2001)—is an independent office of the Legislative Assembly of Manitoba whose stated purpose is to assist Members of the Legislative Assembly with matters such as accountability and the performance of government.

Leading the Office, as per The Auditor General Act, is the Auditor General of Manitoba, an officer of the Legislative Assembly who provides comprehensive control over the accounts created by the provincial government. Appointed by the presiding Lieutenant Governor for a 10-year term, the Auditor General can only be removed by a vote of two-thirds of the Assembly. The Auditor General is authorized to conduct and report on financial statement audits and project audits.

The current Auditor General of Manitoba is Tyson Shtykalo.

History 
Manitoba's Audit Office was established in 1885 to provide increased accountability over the provincial government's use of public funds and served as a centralized agency for the examination of provincial accounts. In 1876, Alexander Begg was appointed as Manitoba's first Provincial Auditor, who is in charge of heading the Audit Office. The Provincial Auditor was appointed by the Lieutenant-Governor-in-Council to audit all accounts of expenditure and receipt maintained by the government, and to report all findings to the Legislative Assembly. Though it reported directly to Cabinet, the Office was, for administrative purposes, placed under the authority of the Provincial Treasurer.

Reporting directly to the Department of the Provincial Treasurer, the Comptrolling and Audit Branch (or, Office of the Comptroller-General) was established in 1916 and assumed the functions of the Audit Office. The Branch was formed by an amendment to the Treasury Act that stipulated the need for greater security concerning the expenditure of public funds and for a more efficient means of keeping public accounts. This followed the findings of the 1916 "Mathers Inquiry", a royal commission into government misuse of public funds related to the construction of the new Legislative Building (a scandal that resulted in the resignation of Premier Rodmond Roblin).

The Branch amalgamated the functions of the former Audit Office with several comptrolling functions that were previously attached to the Office of the Provincial Treasurer into a centralized, quasi-independent entity that reported directly to both Executive Council and the Provincial Treasurer. The Branch divided its auditing functions between the offices of the Auditor of Revenue, the Auditor of Disbursements, and the Auditor of Purchases, which were overseen by an appointed Comptroller-General. The Comptroller-General directed the overall auditing of receipts and expenditures made by the Government of Manitoba and was also responsible for preparing all government cheques prior to their issuance by the Provincial Treasurer.

In 1969, the Comptrolling and Audit Branch was dismantled following the reorganization of the Treasury Department with its comptrolling responsibilities taken by the Comptroller Division of the new Department of Finance and its auditing functions being assumed by the Office of the Provincial Auditor. This Provincial Auditor's Office was established by the Provincial Auditor Act, which provided for the creation of a self-regulating, quasi-judicial agency responsible for the provision of auditing services to the provincial government.

The title eventually changed to Auditor General in 2002 with The Auditor General Act (2001).

List of Auditors General 
Appointed in 1876, Alexander Begg was Manitoba's first Provincial Auditor. The title of this position was later changed to Comptroller General, eventually changing back to Provincial Auditor, and finally to Auditor General in 2002.

References

External links
Office of the Auditor General Manitoba

Auditor_General_Manitoba, Office_of_the
Manitoba